Southwestern Adventist University is a private Adventist university in Keene, Texas.  It is owned by the Southwestern Union Conference of Seventh-day Adventists.  The university enrolls about 800 students on a rural, 150-acre campus.

The university is accredited by the Southern Association of Colleges and Schools and the Adventist Accrediting Association. The nursing program is approved by the Texas Board of Nurse Examiners.

History

Southwestern Adventist University was founded in 1893 as Keene Industrial Academy. The purchase of property for the school was financed by Seventh-day Adventists in the Dallas area. Its first building, completed in 1894, was also used as a church. The school, which opened with 56 students, adopted its current name in 1996.

On January 2, 1944, the West Hall boy's dormitory, which had undergone extensive repairs in the summer of 1943, was destroyed by fire. 16-year-old student Reginald Maddison was awakened by a rumbling sound around 5:00 a.m. and saw flames emerging from a dust closet. He alerted students to the fire and activated the fire alarm. 12 students, including Maddison, escaped unharmed. One student was injured when jumping from a second story window. 2 students died during the fire. Curtis "Lee Roy" Birdwell, 15, was found in the basement underneath his dorm room. Virgil Dye, 17, was found near the chimney towards the center of the blaze.

Southwestern Adventist University is located at the town of Keene, Texas, six miles northeast of Cleburne. Keene has been described as an Adventist "company" town. On Saturdays, the Sabbath for Adventists, most stores in town are closed.

The Keene Seventh-day Adventist Church has several thousand members. It is the Southwestern Adventist University church.

The Seventh-day Adventist Church in America is divided into administrative units called unions, and most of these unions have a college. Most of these colleges were founded in the 1890s, a period of intense activity in Adventist history.

The university evolved through several stages from Keene Industrial Academy to its present university status. At its beginning, it sold acreage to Adventist families and industries, and is now the largest Adventist community in the Southwestern Union, which includes Texas, Arkansas, Oklahoma, Louisiana, and New Mexico.

Academics

During Fall 2014, Southwestern began to offer a Fire Science degree. The program is the only one of its kind among Seventh-day Adventist colleges and universities. Graduates of this program will receive a degree, as well as several technical certifications that will allow them to become employed by fire departments around the nation.

Athletics
The Southwestern Adventist (SWAU) athletic teams are called the Knights. The university is a member of the United States Collegiate Athletic Association (USCAA) since the 2002–03 academic year. They are also a member of the National Christian College Athletic Association (NCCAA), primarily competing as an independent in the Southwest Region of the Division II level. The Knights previously competed in the Red River Athletic Conference (RRAC) of the National Association of Intercollegiate Athletics (NAIA) from 1998–99 to 2001–02.

SWAU competes in eight intercollegiate varsity sports: Men's sports include basketball and soccer; while women's sports include basketball, soccer and volleyball; and co-ed sports include cross country, gymnastics and tennis.

See also

 List of Seventh-day Adventist colleges and universities
 Seventh-day Adventist education

References

External links
 
 Official athletics website

Private universities and colleges in Texas
Universities and colleges affiliated with the Seventh-day Adventist Church
Seventh-day Adventist universities and colleges in the United States
Educational institutions established in 1893
Universities and colleges accredited by the Southern Association of Colleges and Schools
Education in Johnson County, Texas
1893 establishments in Texas
USCAA member institutions